Museo Mural Diego Rivera is a museum in Mexico City where Diego Rivera's 1946–47 mural Sueño de una Tarde Dominical en la Alameda Central is located.

Location
It is located at Balderas Avenue number 202, in the historic center of Mexico City.

Objective
It is the goal of the museum to preserve and disseminate Diego Rivera's artistic work, as well as organize temporary exhibits and conferences and events, talks, concerts and other art activities.

History

The museum was built in 1986 as a space to exhibit Diego Rivera's 1946–47 mural Sueño de una tarde dominical en la Alameda Central (Dream of a Sunday Afternoon in the Alameda Central). It had previously been housed at the Hotel del Prado, which was severely damaged in the 1985 Mexico City earthquake.

In order to transport the mural from the hotel, the wall that supported it was cut; later, a metal structure was used to support its 15-ton weight, still preserved to date. The museum's building and its facilities were built around the mural, after it was placed at its current location. The museum was inaugurated on February 19, 1988.

Management
The museum is administered by the Instituto Nacional de Bellas Artes y Literatura (INBAL, Spanish: National Institute of Fine Arts and Literature), which in turn is funded by the federal government.

The mural

In 1946, architect Carlos Obregón Santacilia asked Diego Rivera to create a mural for the Hotel del Prado's Versalles dining room. The subject for the mural was the Alameda Central, which was across the street from the hotel.  The artist made a fresco of 4.70 x 15.6 m. It was finished in 1947. The mural shows more than 150 figures, some of them leading characters the history of Mexico: Hernán Cortés, Benito Juárez, Maximiliano de Habsburgo, Francisco I. Madero, Porfirio Díaz. In addition, individuals from different social classes appear, including street vendors and revolutionaries. It also shows Frida Kahlo and other wives of the artist, as well as some of his daughters; the Alameda Central itself can be seen in the background.

The painter said: "[The mural] is composed of memories of my life, my childhood and my youth and goes from 1895 to 1910. All the characters are dreaming, some asleep on benches and others, walking and talking ":

Exhibits to date
Previous exhibits:

See also
 Museo Anahuacalli
 Museo Dolores Olmedo Patiño
 Frida Kahlo Museum 
 Pinacoteca Diego Rivera
 Museo Casa Estudio Diego Rivera y Frida Kahlo
 List of single-artist museums

References

External links
Página web del Museo Mural Diego Rivera

Art museums and galleries in Mexico
Biographical museums in Mexico
Historic center of Mexico City
Museums devoted to one artist
Murals in Mexico